The taekwondo competitions at the 2013 Mediterranean Games in Mersin took place between 21 June and 23 June at the Edip Buran Sports Hall. This was the first time that taekwondo was held at the Mediterranean Games.

Athletes competed in 8 weight categories.

Medal table

Medal summary

Men's events

Women's events

References

 
2013
2013 in taekwondo
Sports at the 2013 Mediterranean Games
International taekwondo competitions hosted by Turkey